SFGATE is a news website based out of San Francisco, California, covering news, culture, travel, food, politics and sports in the Bay Area, Hawaii and California. The site, owned by Hearst Newspapers, reaches approximately 25 million to 30 million unique readers a month, making it the second most popular news site in California, after the Los Angeles Times.

Launched in 1994 as The Gate, and renamed SFGATE in 1998, the site served as the digital home of the San Francisco Chronicle until 2017. SFGATE and the San Francisco Chronicle split into two separate newsrooms in 2019, with independent editorial staff. The SFGATE newsroom consists of about 40 staff, including Drew Magary, and Rod Benson. Grant Marek has served as editor-in-chief since 2019.

Awards and accolades 
In 2012, SFGATE won the Pulitzer Prize for Mark Fiore's cartoons, marking the first time the award had been given to work not appearing in print.

In 2021, the site won 10 San Francisco Press Club awards for stories including a look at the future of San Francisco's Great Highway and a profile on members of the Paiute Tribe saving their ancestral homeland from wildfires.

References

External links

American news websites